Peru participated at the 2018 Summer Youth Olympics in Buenos Aires, Argentina from 6 October to 18 October 2018.

Athletics

Peru qualified 2 athletes (1 boy and 1 girl) to compete in athletics.

 Boys: Kevin Cahuana (Men's 100 metres)
 Girls: Freysi Donaire (Women's 100 metres)

Badminton

Peru qualified one player based on the Badminton Junior World Rankings. 

Singles

Team

Beach volleyball

Peru qualified a girls' team based on their overall ranking from the South American Youth Tour.

 Girls' tournament: Madelyn Mendoza and Lisbeth Allca

Judo

Peru qualified one athlete in judo.

 Girls: Noemí Huayhuameza (Women −52 kg)

Individual

Team

Rowing

Peru qualified one boat based on its performance at the American Qualification Regatta.

 Boys' single sculls: Ángel Sosa

Sailing

Peru qualified two boats based on its performance at the Central and South American Techno 293+ Qualifiers.

 Boys' Techno 293+: Raúl Claux Villa
 Girls' Techno 293+: Cristina Arróspide

Shooting

Peru qualified one shooter.

 Boys' 10m Air Rifle: Carlos Arze

Individual

Mixed

Swimming

Peru qualified 3 athletes (1 boy and 2 girls) to compete in swimming.

 Boys: Adrián Paseta 	(Men's 100m and 200m Butterfly)	 	
 Girls: Samantha Bello (Women's 200m, 400m and 800m Freestyle) and Andrea Hurtado (Women's 100m and 200m Backstroke)

Triathlon

Peru qualified one athlete based on its performance at the 2018 American Youth Olympic Games Qualifier.

Individual

Relay

Weightlifting

Peru qualified one quota in the boys' events and one quota in the girls' events based on the team ranking after the 2017 Weightlifting Youth World Championships.

Boy

Girl

References

2018 in Peruvian sport
Nations at the 2018 Summer Youth Olympics
Peru at the Youth Olympics